Wandering Souls (German: Irrende Seelen) is a 1921 German silent drama film directed by Carl Froelich and starring Asta Nielsen, Alfred Abel, and Walter Janssen. It was based on the 1869 novel The Idiot by Fyodor Dostoyevsky. The film was the first of three to be made by Russo Film, a small production company set up by Decla-Bioscop to make literary adaptations. It was shot at the Johannisthal Studios in Berlin. It premiered on 3 March 1921 at the Marmorhaus in Berlin.

Cast

References

Bibliography
 Hardt, Ursula. From Caligari to California: Erich Pommer's life in the International Film Wars. Berghahn Books, 1996.

External links

Danish Filme Institute

1921 films
1921 drama films
German drama films
Films of the Weimar Republic
German silent feature films
Films directed by Carl Froelich
Films based on The Idiot
Films set in Russia
Films produced by Erich Pommer
German black-and-white films
Silent drama films
Films shot at Johannisthal Studios
1920s German films